Richard Hannon may refer to:

Richard Hannon Sr. (born 1945), British racehorse trainer
Richard Hannon Jr. (born 1975), his son, British racehorse trainer